The Second Songhua River is a tributary of the Songhua River in  Jilin Province, China. 

The river meets the Songhua and Nen Rivers near Songyuan and has several tributaries, including the First Dao, the Second Dao, Huifa, Yinma, Yitong and Lafa Rivers. It is interrupted by the Baishan, Hongshi and Fengman Dams.

References

Rivers of Jilin
Songhua River
 01